Gordonia maingayi is a species of plant in the family Theaceae. It is a tree endemic to Peninsular Malaysia. It is threatened by habitat loss.

References

maingayi
Endemic flora of Peninsular Malaysia
Trees of Peninsular Malaysia
Vulnerable plants
Taxonomy articles created by Polbot
Taxobox binomials not recognized by IUCN